Leptuca beebei, commonly known as Beebe's fiddler crab, is a species of fiddler crab native to the Pacific coasts of Central and South America, from El Salvador to northern Peru.

Taxonomy

Previously a member of the genus Uca, the species was transferred in 2016 to the genus Leptuca when Leptuca was promoted from subgenus to genus level.

Description

Habitat
The species can be found on open muddy sand flats in tropical regions.

References

Ocypodoidea
Crustaceans of the eastern Pacific Ocean
Taxa named by Jocelyn Crane
Crustaceans described in 1941